Devika is an Indian pop singer and songwriter.

Early life and education
Devika started vocal music training in New Delhi, India when she was eight years old. She continued her training and advanced to Ragas and Hindustani classical music.

She moved to the United States for her undergraduate study in Computer Science at Georgetown University. It was during these years that she experimented with a fusion of Indian classical music and western compositions and teamed up with Holmes Ives and performed vocals for the album titled Satyriasis. After graduation she resumed her formal training in Hindustani classical music.

Career
She recorded a self-titled Indian pop music album with Shehzad Hasan (Shahi) of Vital Signs, Noor Lodhi, Manesh Judge and Anshuman Chandra of SaazMantra.

Sony BMG India released a compilation called "Teri Deewani" with the track "Kehnde Ne Naina" in August, 2007.

Devika's second solo album, "Saari Raat", was released on 17 November 2009. Sony Music India licensed "Barkha Bahaar" and "Kehnde Ne Naina" for their compilations titled "Sufiaana : The Complete Sufi Experience" and "Judaiyan" in 2010, and for "Javeda Sufiaana" in 2011. Devika's latest collaborations "Aaja Piya" (with Holmes Ives ) and "Naraaz Mausam" (with Zohaib Kazi from Coke Studio Pakistan) have been featured on Sony Music India's album "Lounge Nirvana".

Discography
 Satyriasis (Shaken Not Stirred Records, 2001) with Holmes Ives
 Devika (2007) with Shahi Hasan, Manesh Judge, Noor Nodhi, Anshuman Chandra
 Teri Deewani (2007) a compilation with Artists including A. R. Rahman, Nusrat Fateh Ali Khan, Kailash Kher, Rabbi and Rahat Fateh Ali Khan
 Ek Kaagaz (2008) an Internet-Only advertising supported single with Pralay Bakshi and Saazmantra.
 Da Rap Star (2009) with Bohemia
 Saari Raat (2009) with Shahi Hasan, Manesh Judge and Noor Lodhi
 Colours : Sufi Ke Anek Rang (2009) a compilation with Artists including A. R. Rahman, Nusrat Fateh Ali Khan, Rahat Fateh Ali Khan and Sonu Nigam
 Sufiaana - The Complete Sufi Experience : (2010) a compilation with Artists including A.R. Rahman, Nusrat Fateh Ali Khan, Rahat Fateh Ali Khan
 Judaiyan : (2010) a compilation with Artists including A.R. Rahman
 Javeda Sufiaana : (2010) a compilation with Artists including Kailash Kher, Rahat Fateh Ali Khan and others.
 Bijuri - The Single (2011) with Zohaib Kazi from Coke Studio Pakistan
 Lounge Nirvana (2012) a compilation with Artists including A.R. Rahman, Rahul Sharma
 Phir Ek Tera Pyar (2020) Bohemia ft Devika *Remake of ik tera pyar - 2007)

References

External links
Devika's Official Website

Indian women pop singers
Indian women singer-songwriters
Indian singer-songwriters
Punjabi-language singers
Georgetown College (Georgetown University) alumni
Living people
Year of birth missing (living people)
Singers from Delhi
Women musicians from Delhi